Bob Bryan and Mike Bryan were the defending champions but lost in the semifinals to Sébastien Grosjean and Nicolas Kiefer.

Grosjean and Kiefer won in the final 6–4, 6–4 against Justin Gimelstob and Michaël Llodra.

Seeds

  Donald Johnson /  Jared Palmer (quarterfinals)
  Bob Bryan /  Mike Bryan (semifinals)
  David Adams /  Sjeng Schalken (first round)
  Neville Godwin /  Kevin Ullyett (quarterfinals)

Draw

External links
 2002 Mercedes-Benz Cup Doubles draw

Los Angeles Open (tennis)
2002 ATP Tour